Charles William Leng (6 April 1859 – 24 January 1941) was an American naturalist and historian especially associated with Staten Island, New York, where he was the borough historian from 1923 until the 1930s.

Leng was an internationally known entomologist who co-founded the Staten Island Institute of Arts & Sciences with William T. Davis. He served as director from 1919 until his death on January 24, 1941.

Leng is known for his 1920 work on the beetles of the United States of America. He was also co-author with Davis of Staten Island and its People, a comprehensive five-volume history of the island from 1609 to 1929.

Legacy
Public School 54, in the Willowbrook section of Staten Island, is named after Charles W. Leng.

Publications 
 Willis Stanley Blatchley, Charles William Leng, Rhynchophora or weevils of north eastern America, Indianapolis, The Nature Publishing Company, 1916 - 682 pages Full text
 Catalogue of the Coleoptera of America North of Mexico Mount Vernon, N. Y.: John D. Sherman, Jr. also with Willis Blatchley.

References
 Staten Island Advance, January 13, 2009, accessed January 14, 2009.
 Obituary on JSTOR

External links
Encyclopedia of Life  accesses full list of taxa (1,133) described by Leng (type Leng into the search box)

Historians from New York (state)
American entomologists
American naturalists
People from Staten Island
1859 births
1941 deaths
Scientists from New York (state)
Historians of New York City
History of Staten Island